Nelson is a small fishing town in Victoria, Australia. At the 2016 census, Nelson and the surrounding area had a population of 190.

In January 1852 the name of Nelson was adopted for the settlement, after the ship Lady Nelson,

 
which was used by Lieutenant James Grant in explorations of the area in the early nineteenth century.

A punt was built across the river in 1848 by Henry Kellett. A summerhouse was also built in 1848, which later became the town's current hotel. The town site was surveyed and named in 1852 by Lindsay Clarke, and sheep grazing began soon after. Settlement of the township came much later, a Post Office being opened on 17 March 1876.

The Portland-Nelson Road is the only main road in and out of Nelson and crosses the Glenelg at Nelson and is the only crossing for over 25 km.  The first crossing over the Glenelg was constructed out of wood in 1893.  It was replaced by a steel cantilever bridge in 1963. A second concrete cantilever bridge was added in 1997 on the north side of the steel bridge to cater for the demands of road freight travelling through the town.

Traditional ownership
The formally recognised traditional owners for the area in which Nelson sits are the Gunditjmara People who are represented by the Gunditj Mirring Traditional Owners Aboriginal Corporation.

Notes

References
 Learmonth, Noel F. (1970). Four Towns and a Survey. Hawthorn Press: Melbourne

External links

Towns in Victoria (Australia)
Coastal towns in Victoria (Australia)
Western District (Victoria)
Fishing communities in Australia